The National Archives of Georgia is the legal entity of public law under the Ministry of Justice of the nation of Georgia. The National Archives holds written documents, film documents, photos, and audio records, totaling more than five million exhibits. The exhibits preserved at the depositories of the archives are dated back to the 9th through 21st century. They include: historical, contemporary history, audio-visual archives and local archives from every region. The documents in the Archives are official, and their preservation has been established by law. Some of the preserved documents include texts from the First Republic, scientific archives, the parish books that hold information about the christening and the death of citizens, the gospel of the 9th century, Anchi gospel (12th century), Kings' deeds, private letters, verdicts, other legal monuments, photos from the 19th century, first film documents, and the documents of different state or private structures.

The History of the National Archives

The National Archives serve the political, economical, scientific and cultural interests of the country and as an ancestors’ documentary heritage is the essential trapping of the authority. In ancient Georgia, as well as in other countries,  manuscripts were kept and preserved by their authors, secular and ecclesiastic jutoddictions – court and religious centers.  Every jurisdiction would penerally need  juridical standards and the documents depicting them, legislative acts, income: expense books, agreements, deeds, diplomatic letters (etc.) in internal and foreign relatives.

According to the indirect notifications it is confirmed that there was a royal archive in the 6th century that was not only the treasury but the depository for documents. Church and private archives also existed.

The modern archives in Georgia were established on April 23, 1920, according to the law about the establishment of Republic's Central Scientific Archive, issued by the Democratic Republic of Georgia. On July 1, 1921 the revolutionary committee of Georgia issued a decree “About the reorganization of the Archival Affair”. From 2004 the archival institution was under the Ministry of Justice of Georgia as the State department of Archives of Georgia.

In accordance with the law # 71 from March 12, 2007, issued by the Minister of Justice of Georgia, the legal entity the National Archives of Georgia was formed. At present,  the state control of archival and clerical work fields, the development of the national archival fund, is in its authority.

The functions of the National Archives
The National Archives of Georgia under the state control independently ensures the ruling of archival affairs in Georgia, the improvement of clerical work and the development of the national archival fund.

The goals of the National Archives of Georgia are:

a) the supplement of the national archival fund;
b) the description and the centralized registration of the national archival fund;
c) to ensure the protection and the preservation of the documents of the national archival fund, the conservation, the restoration of the damaged documents, to create the insurance fund on the documents of the special value;
d) to provide the free acknowledgment on the documents of the national archival fund according to the stated legislation;
e) the organization, coordination, the normative and methodical ensuring of the work of the central archives and territorial organs – the local archives.

On the base of the law of Georgia "About the National Archival Fund and the National Archives", the National Archive realizes the registration, protection and the preservation of the documents of the national archival fund without the distinction of their place of preservation (among them the monuments of the cultural heritage from the national archival fund), also the state control and the supervision of the rules of the clerical work.

The National Archives of Georgia receives the documents of the national archival fund in time and regularized.

Realizes to display the documents representing the history of Georgia preserved in foreign Archives, prepares the sentences to acquire these documents or their copies.

Provides the protection of the archival documents preserved in the National Archives, the monitoring and the optimization arrangements of the conditions of their preservation.

Provides the free acknowledgment of the interested persons on the documents of the national archival fund according to the stated legislation.

Publishes the documents of the national archival fund according to the stated rules, also the informational literature about the composition and the content of the documents preserved in the National Archives of Georgia.

It realizes the methodical leadership and control of the activities of the central archives and the local archives - the territorial organs of the National archives of Georgia.

It controls and guides the work of the archives of different institutions, also the preparation of their documentation to pass to the National Archives of Georgia.

Conducts the scientific research works in the field of archives, documents, archeography and adjacent historical disciplines; works out methodical manuals, collects, analyzes and pervades scientific-technical information in the field of archives and documents.

The Central Archives

The Central Historical Archive of Georgia

The origin of the Central Historical Archive of Georgia is connected with the activities of the so-called military historical department at the staff of Caucasus army in 1878 and Caucasus military archive, established in 1908.

After the declaration of the independence of Georgia, on 26 May 1918, the archival materials, scattered through the country, were gathered in one archival institution. In 1920 it was called the Central Scientific Archive and the State Historical Archive of Georgia in 1939.

The Central Historical Archive is one of the most important scientific institutions of our country. The precious documents, hold in this archive, represents the rich materials for the studies of not only Georgian but Caucasian history.

Department of Ancient Documents

The Central Historical Archive holds plenty of documentary materials and written monuments that were created during centuries and depict the history of our nation.

The unique materials preserved at the department of Ancient Documents that are dated back to the first half of 9th-19th centuries are exceptionally valuable.

Four collections of Georgian historical documents are preserved at the department. The documents depict feudal-economical and cultural life, the issues of the landownership and interdependence of separate ranks, the history of principalities, court organization, the relation with neighbouring countries, peasants' taxes, custom system, condition of churches in Georgia and many other interesting matters.

The collection of Georgian ancient document originals include over 11,000 documents. The materials of the documents are parchment (small number) and paper (white, gray, sky-blue and light brown). Most of the scripts are Mkhedruli, and the small part are Nuskhuri (the old Georgian scripts).

Among the documents, preserved in the collection, the earliest one is the donation of adornments, parish things and slave-estate to Mtskheta Svetitskhoveli, issued by Catholicos Melkisedek, dated by 1029-1033. The parchment.

The following documents are very important:
 The deed of renovated donation of villages given to Shiomghvime monastery by Giorgi II in 1072, fragment, parchment.

 Two documents issued by David Aghmashenebeli: 1. the grace deed of estate given to Niania Nianidze by David Aghmashenebeli; 2. the will of David Aghmashenebeli given to Shiomgvime monastery, dated by 1123. He has donated Kartli villages and the property taken from Persia, fragment, parchment.
 The donation book of village Chorvila, issued by Queen Tamar in 1187, to Gelati Virgin monastery to feed twelve poor wanderers, parchment.
 The dismissal deed, issued by Lasha-Giorgi in 1222, given to Shimghvime monastery. King has released village Agara from taxes, fragment, parchment.
 The documents issued by Georgian Kings – Konstantine I, Alexsander I, the Great, Leoni, Archili, Vakhtang VI, Teimuraz I, Teimuraz II, Erekle II, Giorgi XII, also the deeds of Catholicos-Patriarchs and other ecclesiastic persons are presented in the collection.

Three collections of the ancient documents’ copies are not of less importance. They cover the 11th-19th centuries. These documents are rewritten from the originals in different time by different persons. There are many public figures among the scribes. The rewritten copies are as valuable as the originals because most of the rewritten documents have not reached to our days.

The Georgian manuscript books’ collection consist 9th-19th centuries. Mainly paper is used for material, the part is written on parchment. The most part is written with Mkhedruli and Nuskhuri, the small part – Asomtavruli. The manuscripts’ contents consist many spheres: history, philology, hagiography, secular and parish law, Old and New Testament, geology, physics, lexicography, mythology, medicine, prose, poetry, etc.

There are the autographs of Vakhushti Batonishvili, David Tumanishvili, Nikoloz Baratashvili, Giorgi Eristavi and Rapiel Eristavi among the manuscript books.

The ancient manuscript, dated back to the 9th century, is a gospel. It is written on parchment with Asomtavruli. It is the equal of Jruchi gospel.

The canticle with note system, allots to 9th-10th centuries; it is written on parchment with Nuskhuri, fragment. The gospel of Queen Tamar is dated back to the 12th century. Its cover is decorated with silver and big green stone, made by the goldsmith Beka Opizari. It has the miniatures; one of them is Matthew. By the order of Queen Tamar, the manuscript was taken from Tskarostavi Church (Klarjeti) and set in Anchiskhati Church.

Gulani (the collection of theologian works) of the 16th century is distinguished with miniatures and is attached 12 pictures with different colours. The author is unknown. The manuscript is thick. It’s rewritten in Megrelia by the order of Levan (I) Dadiani.

The gospel of 1534 is the earliest among the dated manuscripts. Its leather cover is decorated with silver cross.
The History and Geography of Georgia and Atlas (autographs) of Vakhushti Batonishvili, Georgian dictionary of Sulkhan-Saba Orbeliani, Rusudaniani, the Knight in the Panther’s Skin, the law books of Vakhtang VI, the World History of David Tumanishvili, the poetry of Teimuraz I, the medical books, Giorgi Eristavi’s “Gakra” (division) (with the pictures of Italian artist Corradin), “Rhetoric” of Anton Catholicos and many others are among the manuscript books.

The personal funds of the ecclesiastical persons and historians that are not less important and interesting, are also stored in the department. Among them are the personal funds of Kirion II, Polievktos Karbelashvili, Giorgi Bochoridze, Tedo Zhordania. Each of these persons has done their bit in collecting the historical documents, researching and editing them.

The Central Archive of the Contemporary History of Georgia
The Central Archive of the Contemporary History of Georgia was founded in 1927.

It is one of the biggest fund holders, where the documents about the activities of state authorities and supreme board organs, scientific-research and higher educational institutions, trade unions, voluntary organizations, sport societies and other institutions are gathered. About one million preserving units of 1618 funds, dating from 1921 (1918) to the present time are kept there.

The personal funds of Georgian famous people - scientists, cultural and educational workers are preserved in this archive (total 376 funds, 15312 preserving units).

The archive realizes control functions in the field of supreme authority groups in the business correspondence and archival field.

2006
In 2006, the Archives expanded to include the Central Historical Archive of Georgia and the National Archive of Kutaisi, also known as the Kutaisis State Historical Archives.

Department of Scientific and Technical Documentation 

In the Department of Scientific and Technical Documentation of the Central Archive of the Contemporary History, the different sort of board, design, scientific, technological and patent documents are preserved. The documents are connected with the lay-out of the cities, administrative buildings, housing constructions, industrial and agricultural buildings, power networks and water thrifts, aircraft, fluvial and sea ports, tunnels, bridges, etc.

The technical department is rich with the personal funds of Georgia's famous workers of science and techniques. The warm and business-like interrelation of the scientists of foreign countries towards the Georgian people is underlined in these correspondences.

The technical department holds 133,553 preserving units, among them 95,952 units are technical.

The Department of Literature and Art 
The Department of Literature and Art of the Central Archive of Contemporary History holds the materials of creative unions, societies, publishing-houses and editorial offices, schools and e. t. c., as well as personal funds of literary and art workers.

The Archive of Literature and Art was created in 1970. The eminent cultural workers responded to the creation of the archive. They have transferred their family funds to the archive free of charge. Exactly in this way were created the personal funds of Erekle Jabadari, Zurab Anjaparidze, Leila Abashidze, Kita Buachidze, Levan Gotua, Anzor Erkomaishvili, Medea Kakhidze, Mikheil Kvlividze, Vazha Azarashvili, Besarion Zhghenti, Akaki Khorava, Akaki Shanidze, Revaz Anjaparidze and others.

The department of literature and art is also rich with the personal archives of the Georgian honored workers living in foreign countries. This department holds: the funds of Alexandre Sulkhanishvili, Ilia Kuchukhidze, Giorgi Nakashidze, Vakhtang Zhordania and others, as well as the rich collections of emigrant writing.

131 851 files of 321 funds dated with 1780-2006 are preserved in the department of literature and art.

The Central Archive of Audio-Visual Documents
The Archive of Audio-Visual Documents was founded in 1944. It consists of the departments of film, photo, phonograph documents, utilization and publication.

The archive holds 328 133 preserving unites, among them 34 228 film documents, 274 625 photos and 19 280 voice records.

The informational-searching system of film documents was created at the archive.

For photo documents systematic, nominative and author’s catalogues are created; for voice records – genre-thematic and implementation-author’s catalogues, archive’s guide.

Film Archive
The first documentary preserved at the archive is dated by 1909. This is “The funeral of the head of city Tbilisi Alexander Matinov”; “The review of Tbilisi military garrison before Alexander Nevel’s military temple” was shot in 1910; “The sanctify of the new building of Bank in Tbilisi” is also dated by 1910; the funeral of the famous manufacturer and the public man David Sarajishvili is dated by 1911.

“The Journey of Akaki Tsereteli in Racha-Lechkhumi” shot in 1912 by the cameraman Vasil Amashukeli is the first full-length chronicle-documentary film.

The archive also holds the chronicles of 1918-1920: the parade of the national guard in Tbilisi; the parade of Shevardnelys on the Vake field on May 26, 1920. Here is also the arrival of the leaders of the first International.

One little subject has saved us the civil funeral rites of the Armenian artist and scene-painter in Tbilisi. Sh. Eliava, Sandro Akhmeteli, Titsian Tabidze, Paolo Iashvili and others were presented.

The archival materials depict the social-political movement, economical development, the current process of culture, science and religion.

Photo Archive

Alexander Ivanitski made the oldest photograph that has reached to our days in 1858. It represents the views of Tbilisi and Mtskheta.
The archive has rich collections of Alexsandre Roinashvili, K. Zanisa, N. Sagharadze, E. Klara, Dimitri Ermakov and others.
The works of Dimitri Ermakov – the views of Batumi, Poti, Sukhumi, Borjomi, the construction of the railway line of South Caucasus, Georgian churches and monasteries are especially important.
The photos of Dimitri Ermakov represent valuable ethnographic materials.

The photo documents about the war between Russia and Turkey are also preserved at the archive.

Audio Archive 

Unique voice records are preserved at the depositories of the phonograph archive. The 1912 speech of Akaki Tsereteli, address to future generations. The "Golden Fund" of the archive holds the poetry articulated by Akaki Tsereteli: "Mgosani" and "Gantiadi". The romances sung by Vano Sarajishvili are also preserved in this fund. The couplets from the life of old Tbilisi are represented by the actors B. Abashia and N. Gotsiridze.

The rich collections of the records are preserved at the archive. It contains the masterpieces of the Italian operatic music from the end of the 19th century to the beginning of the 20th century.

There are the phonographic records of Georgian folk music performed by M. Tarkhnisvili, S. Kavsadze, K. Pachkoria, Dz. Lolua and other ethnographical ensembles and chorus groups.

The literary-dramatic records include: the monologues read by the coryphaeus of Georgian theatre Ushangi Chkheidze, the fragments from Georgian performances by Sh. Ghambashidze, T. Chavchavadze, M. Davitashvili, Veriko Anjaparidze, Akaki Khorava, Akaki Vasadze and others.

The treasure of the archive of the phonographs also represents the voice records of famous Georgian scientists: Korneli Kekelidze, Akaki Shanidze, Giorgi Chubinashvili, Giorgi Akhvlediani, Ivane Beritashvili, Niko Muskhelishvili, Ilia Vekua, Shalva Chkhetia and others.

References

External links
The National Archives of Georgia
 

Archives in Georgia (country)
Georgia